Jan Hrbatý (20 January 1942 – 23 July 2019) was a Czech ice hockey player who played for the Czechoslovak national team. He won a silver medal at the 1968 Winter Olympics.

References

External links

1942 births
2019 deaths
Czech ice hockey forwards
Czechoslovak ice hockey forwards
HC Dukla Jihlava players
Ice hockey players at the 1968 Winter Olympics
Medalists at the 1968 Winter Olympics
Olympic ice hockey players of Czechoslovakia
Olympic medalists in ice hockey
Olympic silver medalists for Czechoslovakia
People from Prostějov District
Sportspeople from the Olomouc Region